These quarterbacks have started at least one game for the Carolina Panthers of the National Football League.

Quarterback starts (by season)

The number of games started during the season is listed to the right of the player's name.

Most games as starting quarterback
The following quarterbacks have the most starts for the Panthers in regular season games.  Bold text indicates the player is currently on the team's roster.

Through the 2022 NFL season

Team Career Passing Records 
(Through the 2021 NFL Season)

See also

 List of NFL starting quarterbacks

References

Carolina Panthers

Starting quarterbacks